Dussan, Dussán, or Dussane is a surname. It is the surname of:
Alicia Dussán de Reichel (born 1920), Colombian anthropologist and ethnologist
Béatrix Dussane (1888–1969), French actress
Carlos Dussan, winner of the 2018 Grammy Award for Best Recording Package
Elizabeth B. Dussan V. (born 1946), American applied mathematician, physicist, and chemical engineer
Hernando Durán Dussán (1920–1988), Colombian lawyer and politician
Javier Dussan (born 1980), Colombian footballer
Lina Dussan, Colombian gymnast in the 2018 Pacific Rim Gymnastics Championships